ZFA may refer to:

 Zanzibar Football Association, Tanzania
 Zionist Federation of Australia
 Zionist Freedom Alliance
 Faro Airport (Yukon), IATA airport code
 Zentrum für Antisemitismusforschung (Center for Research on Antisemitism, Berlin, Germany)
 Central Agency for German Schools Abroad (Zentralstelle für das Auslandsschulwesen), Federal Office of Administration of the German government
 Zermelo–Fraenkel set theory with atoms, a urelement